Holcothrips is a genus of thrips in the family Phlaeothripidae.

References

Phlaeothripidae
Thrips
Thrips genera